Giasuddin Al Mamun is a Bangladeshi businessman. He is a friend and business partner of the politician Tarique Rahman. Mamun has been in jail since 2007 due to his convictions on numerous corruption cases. He has been sentenced to 20 years imprisonment on 3 cases, 2 of which are for corruption. He is also accused in 20 other cases relating to extortion, corruption, illegal arms possession, and tax evasion.

Mamun owned the now-defunct television channel Channel 1.

Career 
Mamun was a school friend of Tarique Rahman. In 1991, he became a businessman with an investment of Tk. 39,000. By 1996, his wealth reached Tk. 33.94 crore with 45 banks accounts in Bangladesh and abroad. He accumulated even more money during the next BNP government from 2001 to 2006 due to his close relations with Tarique Rahman. He earned thousands of crores of taka by selling concrete poles to the Rural Electrification Board via his business firm Khamba Ltd.

Charges and convictions
Mamun was arrested by the police in 2007 during the 2006–08 Bangladeshi political crisis on an illegal arms case. His house was raided and an illegal revolver was found (because of which he was sentenced to 10 years imprisonment). The raid came after an official of Abdul Monem Ltd. filed a case against Mamun for taking Tk. 1.17 crore as extortion. Mamun was prosecuted by the Bangladesh Anti Corruption Commission (ACC) for acquiring Tk. 101 crore beyond his known source of income in May 2007. In 2008, a court in Dhaka ordered a 10-year prison term for Mamun and 3 years for his wife, Shahina Yasmin, after the charges were proven. Yasmin surrendered to the court in April 2010 and was sent to prison. The High Court acquitted them of the charges in 2012 but the Supreme Court cancelled the High Court verdict in November 2015.

In 2009, Mamun was prosecuted by ACC on a charge of laundering Tk. 204 million to Singapore. In 2011, an FBI agent, Debra Laprevotte, testified against Mamun in court. He was sentenced to seven years in jail and fined Tk. 400 million in November 2013 in a Dhaka court by Third Special Judge Motahar Hossain. His co-defendant, Tarique Rahman, was acquitted. Justice Motahar left the country soon after declaring his verdict.

In July 2016, the High Court reduced Mamun's fine to Tk 200 million. In April 2019, Mamun was further sentenced to 7 years in prison on a money laundering case in which he was convicted of laundering £400 thousand to the United Kingdom.

Personal life 
Mamun is married to Shahina Yasmin, with whom he has 3 children. She was jailed in 2010 after charges against her of amassing Tk. 9.22 crore illegally were proven. His brother is Hafiz Ibrahim, a BNP politician from Barisal. His father, Zainul Abedin, was a former pilot of the Pakistan Air Force. His mother, Mosammat Halima Khatun, died on 25 September 2019 at a hospital in Dhaka.

References

Living people
Bangladeshi businesspeople
Place of birth missing (living people)
Date of birth missing (living people)
Year of birth missing (living people)